Catenipora is an extinct genus of tabulate corals in the family Halysitidae, known from the Ordovician to the Silurian.

C. elegans is known from the Silurian of Estonia.

Species 
 †Catenipora approximata 
 †Catenipora arctica 
 †Catenipora capilliformis 
 †Catenipora copulata 
 †Catenipora crassaeformis 
 †Catenipora distans 
 †Catenipora elegans 
 †Catenipora escharoides 
 †Catenipora exilis 
 †Catenipora gotlandica 
 †Catenipora jingyangensis 
 †Catenipora maxima 
 †Catenipora obliqua 
 †Catenipora panga 
 †Catenipora robusta 
 †Catenipora rubraeformis 
 †Catenipora septosa 
 †Catenipora tapaensis 
 †Catenipora tiewadianensis 
 †Catenipora tongchuanensis 
 †Catenipora tractabilis 
 †Catenipora vespertina 
 †Catenipora workmanae 
 †Catenipora wrighti

References 

Tabulata
Prehistoric Anthozoa genera
Paleozoic cnidarians
Paleozoic invertebrates of North America
Fossil taxa described in 1816
Paleozoic life of Ontario
Paleozoic life of British Columbia
Paleozoic life of Manitoba
Paleozoic life of the Northwest Territories
Paleozoic life of Nunavut
Paleozoic life of Quebec
Paleozoic invertebrates of Europe
Paleozoic invertebrates of Oceania